The Furniture History Society (FHS), which was founded in 1964, is a registered charity in the United Kingdom

Background
The Furniture History Society is based in London, with close connections at the Victoria & Albert Museum. It was founded by a number of art and antique dealers. Since 1965, the society's annual journal ″Furniture History" has published recent findings on British and continental European, Asian and American furniture.  The Furniture History Society is governed by a council elected by its members, which is supported by specialist officers.  Among their longtime leaders was Nicholas Goodison, in whose honour they published a Festschrift and Christopher Gilbert.

In September 2016, the Furniture History Society started a collaboration with the University of London's Institute of Historical Research (IHR) to produce a freely accessible online resource, the "British and Irish Furniture Makers Online" (BIFMO). The initial phase of this database went online at the end of September 2017.

See also
 Chippendale Society
 The Furniture Society

References

External links
 Official website of the Furniture History Society

Organizations established in 1964
Clubs and societies in London
Arts organisations based in the United Kingdom
Heritage organisations in the United Kingdom
Historical societies of the United Kingdom
Furniture
 Antique
Antiques
Furniture-making
Woodworking
Ebeniste
Cabinets (furniture)
Design
Interior design
Charities based in London